Kobilja Glava is a village in Vogošća municipality, near Sarajevo, Federation of Bosnia and Herzegovina, Bosnia and Herzegovina.

Demographics 
According to the 2013 census, its population was 3,092.

References

External links
facebook page
YouTube video

Populated places in Vogošća